This is a list of sites and monuments that are classified or inventoried by the Moroccan ministry of culture around Tata.

Monuments and sites in Tata 

|}

References 

Tata
Monuments